Moral Hazard is a 2002 novel written by Australian author Kate Jennings.

Awards

Festival Awards for Literature (SA), Dymocks Booksellers Award for Fiction, 2004: winner 
New South Wales Premier's Literary Awards, Christina Stead Prize for Fiction, 2003: winner 
Miles Franklin Literary Award, 2003: shortlisted 
Australian Literature Society Gold Medal, 2003: winner

Notes

Listed in "The New York Times" Book Review's list of Notable Books for 2002.

Reviews

 "Mostly Fiction" 
 "The New York Times" 
 "Salon" 
 "San Francisco Chronicle"

References

2002 Australian novels
HarperCollins books
ALS Gold Medal winning works